Quimixtlán Municipality is a municipality in Puebla in south-eastern Mexico.

Climate

References

Municipalities of Puebla